Yevgenia Yakovlevna Bugoslavskaya (21 December 1899 – 30 May 1960) was a Soviet astronomer. She had a lifelong career in astronomy and became professor of astronomy at Moscow University.

Alternative spelling of her name, Evgeniia Iakovlevna Bugoslavskaia.

Life 
Bugoslavskaya was born in Moscow. She grew up in the Moscow suburbs and had an early enthusiasm for astronomy. As teenagers she and her twin sister Natalia paid many visits to the observatory of the Moscow Society of Folk Universities located in the Lubjanca district which was open to the public as part of an educational programme. She was also a recreational pianist and singer.

In 1924 she graduated from Moscow State University . In 1925–1928  she undertook  postgraduate studies at the Astronomical and Geodetic Institute at Moscow State University. In 1928–1932 she worked in the geodetic institute, and from 1932 at the Sternberg Astronomical Institute (SAI). Beginning in 1934 she taught at Moscow State University and from 1949 was professor there.

Work 
She did major works in the field of photographic astrometry and studies of the Sun . She determined (1936–1937) the proper motions of stars in the eastern branch of the dark nebulae of Perseus, Taurus and the Orion Nebula . She studied observations of double stars using a 38 cm astrograph . She was one of the leaders of the expedition which monitored the solar corona at various points of the USSR during the total solar eclipse on June 19, 1936. She was  involved in the processing of observations made with a view to establishing the structure of the corona and the fact of its rotation.

She was one of the leaders of observations during total solar eclipses of 1941, 1945, 1952 and 1954 participating in the processing of observations. 

She studied the fine structure of the solar corona and its inner movements based on eclipse data between 1887–1941 . She worked on equipping  the SAI Observatory on the Lenin Hills with modern equipment. 

She is the author of the  Russian astronomy textbook "Photographic astrometry".

A crater on the planet Venus is named Bugoslavskaya in her honour.

References

Sources 
Reports on Astronomy edited by Jacqueline Bergeron, Springer Science & Business Media, 2012 . Springer Science & Business Media, 2012. 
 Bronshten, Vitali A., and Mikhail M. Dagaev. Evgeniia Iakovlevna Bugoslavskaia. In Vsesoiuznoe astronomo-geodezicheskoe obshchestvo. Biulleten', no. 29 (36), 1961: 57–59. port.  QB1.V752, no. 29 (36)
 Bugoslavskaia, Evgeniia Iakovlevna. In Kolchinskii, Il'ia G., Alla A. Korsun', and Modest G. Rodriges. Astronomy; biograficheskii spravochnik. Izd. 2, dop. i perer. Kiev, Naukova dumka, 1986. p. 58–59. port. QB35.K58 1986
 Evgeniia Iakovlevna Bugoslavskaia (1899–1960). In Astronomicheskii kalendar'. Peremennaia ch. vyp. 64; 1961. Moskva, Gos. izd-vo fiziko – matematicheskoi literatury, 1960. p. 317–318. port.  QB9.A75, 1961

Soviet astronomers
Women astronomers
Soviet academics
1899 births
1960 deaths
Moscow State University alumni
Academic staff of Moscow State University
Soviet women scientists